Tomas Lafchis also pronounced Thomas Laftsis (born 6 August 1958) is a Bulgarian retired footballer who played as a goalkeeper for clubs in Bulgaria, Greece and Belgium.

Playing career
Lafchis began playing football for Bulgarian clubs PFC Cherno More Varna and OFC Sliven. In 1977, he joined PFC Levski Sofia, and helped the club win the Bulgarian Cup and the Bulgarian A PFG in 1979.

In 1981, Lafchis joined Greek First Division side OFI Crete F.C. for two seasons. He moved to fellow First Division club Panathinaikos F.C. for the following two seasons, where he would win the Greek Football Cup. After a brief spell in Belgium, he returned to play two more seasons in the Greek First Division with OFI Crete.

Managerial career
After he retired from playing, Lafchis became a director. He was the owner of Levski Sofia from 1991 to 1999. In this era, Levski managed to win three Bulgarian A PFG titles and four Bulgarian Cups.

Personal
Lafchis is of Greek ethnicity. He is married to Bulgarian National Television director Vyara Ankova.

References

External links
Profile at Events.bg
Profile at Levskisofia.info

1958 births
Living people
Bulgarian footballers
Bulgarian expatriate footballers
Bulgarian football managers
PFC Levski Sofia players
OFI Crete F.C. players
Panathinaikos F.C. players
First Professional Football League (Bulgaria) players
Super League Greece players
Expatriate footballers in Greece
Bulgarian people of Greek descent
Association football goalkeepers
Footballers from Sofia